Dambou (also Dambu) is a dish native to the Zarma and Songhai of Southwestern Niger made from cereals and Moringa. It is consumed at any time but mainly during festive occasions such as outdoorings and weddings. This dish is also common among the Dendi people of North Benin and other West African cities. It is also common in the Zongo Settlements where the Songhai and Zarma travel.

Ingredients
(from a French version of the dish)
Fine wheat semolina or couscous
Spinach (or moringa leaves)
Onion
Aji Dulce capsicum (or similar, like the sweet Martinique pepper or Grenada seasoning chile), or substitute green bell pepper (optional)
Salt
Stock cubes
Cooking oil

Preparation
Dambou is prepared according to the desire and will of the cook. For a simple dish, cooks mostly use either: rice flour or fine hard wheat semolina (couscous semolina) or millet, wheat or corn couscous. The cereals is steamed for about 20 to 30 minutes and added the already boiled moringa leaves. Finally, the other ingredients are added in their raw state: i.e onion, chili, salt, broth, peanut, vegetable oil, meat or fish as a side dish.

References

Nigerien cuisine